The Kolbe–Schmitt reaction or Kolbe process (named after Hermann Kolbe and Rudolf Schmitt) is a carboxylation chemical reaction that proceeds by treating phenol with sodium hydroxide to form sodium phenoxide, then heating sodium phenoxide with carbon dioxide under pressure (100 atm, 125 °C), then treating the product with sulfuric acid. The final product is an aromatic hydroxy acid which is also known as salicylic acid (the precursor to aspirin).

By using potassium hydroxide, 4-hydroxybenzoic acid is accessible, an important precursor for the versatile paraben class of biocides used e.g. in personal care products.

The methodology is also used in the industrial synthesis of 3-hydroxy-2-naphthoic acid;  the regiochemistry of the carboxylation in this case is sensitive to temperature.

Reaction mechanism
The Kolbe–Schmitt reaction proceeds via the nucleophilic addition of a phenoxide, classically sodium phenoxide (NaOC6H5), to carbon dioxide to give the salicylate.
The final step is the reaction (protonation) of the salicylate anion with an acid to form the desired salicylic acids (ortho- and para- isomers).

References

External links
  English Translation of Kolbe's seminal 1860 German article in Annalen der Chemie und Pharmacie that describes the discovery of this reaction. English title: 'On the syntheses of salicylic acid'; German title "Ueber Synthese der Salicylsäure".
  An animation of the reaction mechanism.

Addition reactions
Carbon-carbon bond forming reactions
Industrial processes
Name reactions